All Over You may refer to:
 All Over You (album), a 1972 album by Chilliwack
 "All Over You" (Level 42 song), 1994
 "All Over You" (Live song), 1994
 "All Over You" (The Spill Canvas song)